Saúl Crespo Prieto (born 23 July 1996), commonly known as Saúl, is a Spanish professional footballer who plays as a midfielder for Indian Super League club Odisha.

Club career
Saúl was born in Ponferrada, Castile and León, and joined SD Ponferradina's youth setup in 2010. On 12 August 2015, after finishing his formation, he was loaned to Segunda División B side Atlético Astorga FC for the season.

Saúl made his senior debut on 19 September 2015, coming on as a second-half substitute in a 1–1 away draw against UD Logroñés. On 16 September, he signed a professional contract with Ponfe for three seasons.

Saúl scored his first goal on 10 April 2016, netting the equalizer in a 1–2 loss at CD Guijuelo; he finished the campaign with 25 appearances, as his team suffered relegation. On 8 August, he moved to fellow third division side Arandina CF, also in a temporary deal.

Saúl returned to his parent club in July 2017, and was definitely assigned to the main squad. On 14 June of the following year, he renewed his contract with the club, and contributed with one goal in 30 appearances in 2018–19 as his side returned to Segunda División after three years.

Saúl made his professional debut on 18 August 2019, coming on as a second-half substitute for Yuri de Souza in a 1–3 away loss against Cádiz CF.

Odisha
In July 2022, Saúl moved abroad for the first time, signing a one-year contract with Indian Super League club Odisha.

On 17 August, Saúl made his debut for the club against NorthEast United in the Durand Cup, in a thumping 6–0 win. Six days later, he scored his first goal for the club against Kerala Blasters which ended in 2–0 win.

Career statistics

Club

References

External links

1996 births
Living people
People from Ponferrada
Sportspeople from the Province of León
Spanish footballers
Footballers from Castile and León
Association football midfielders
Segunda División players
Segunda División B players
SD Ponferradina players
Atlético Astorga FC players
Arandina CF players
Odisha FC players
Spanish expatriate sportspeople in India
Expatriate footballers in India